Mr. Del (born Delmar H. Lawrence III; June 10, 1978) is an American Christian rapper and music producer. He is president of the independent record label Dedicated Music Group (DMG)/Universal Records. He received a Grammy award nomination for Best Rock Gospel Album of the year and 2010 GMA Dove Award nomination for Rap/Hip Hop Album of the year.
His first solo album, The Future (EMI Gospel), was released in 2005 and debuted at No. 15 on Billboard’s Gospel Chart. Hope Dealer, was released in 2007 and peaked at No. 47 on Billboard’s Gospel Chart and featured American jazz musician Kirk Whalum. Thrilla (DMG/Universal Records), was released in 2009 and debuted at No. 2 on the Christian R&B/Hip Hop Chart.

Early life and career
Mr. Del was born Delmar Lawrence in Memphis, TN. He began his music career recording a song with the rap group Three 6 Mafia. After dedicating his life to Christ in 2000, he left the secular rap genre to begin his own ministry and record label.

Discography 

1999: Lyrical Millenium
2000: The 2nd Coming 
2000: Enter The Light
2003: Church Age
2003: Da Takeover
2004: Holy South Worldwide
2005: The Future
2006: Holy South: Kingdom Crunk
2007: Crunk Soul: A Nu Soul Project
2007: Hope Dealer
2009: Thrilla
2010: Tennmann
2013: Faith Walka
2014: Hope Dealer 2
2016: Love Noize

References

External links 
 http://www.allmusic.com/artist/mr-del-mn0000607535/discography

American hip hop musicians
Living people
Rappers from Memphis, Tennessee
American performers of Christian hip hop music
African-American male rappers
African-American Christians
African-American record producers
American hip hop record producers
People from Memphis, Tennessee
American clergy
1978 births
21st-century American rappers
21st-century American male musicians
21st-century African-American musicians
20th-century African-American people